Harttiella intermedia is a species of catfish in the family Loricariidae. It is native to South America, where it occurs only in the headwaters of Crique Grand Leblond on Trinité Massif in French Guiana. The species reaches 3.5 cm (1.4 inches) in standard length. It was described in 2012 as part of a taxonomic review of members of the loricariid tribe Harttiini native to the Guianas.

References 

Species described in 2012
Harttiini
Loricariidae
Catfish of South America